Urocotyledon is a genus of lizards in the family Gekkonidae. The genus is endemic to Africa.

Geographic range
Species in the genus Urocotyledon are found on the African mainland and on associated islands.

Species
Six species are recognized as being valid.
Urocotyledon inexpectata  – Seychelles sucker-tailed gecko, Seychelles surprise gecko 
Urocotyledon norzilensis 
Urocotyledon palmata  – Congo palm gecko 
Urocotyledon rasmusseni  – Rasmussen's gecko
Urocotyledon weileri  – Weiler's gecko 
Urocotyledon wolterstorffi  – Wolterstorff's gecko

Nota bene: A binomial authority in parentheses indicates that the species was originally described in a genus other than Urocotyledon.

References

Further reading
Kluge AG (1983). "Cladistic Relationships among Gekkonid Lizards". Copeia 1983 (2): 465-475. (Urocotyledon, new genus).

 
Lizard genera
Taxa named by Arnold G. Kluge